Amal Nasser el-Din (born 31 July 1928) is an Israeli Druze author and former politician who served as a member of the Knesset for Likud between 1977 and 1988.

Biography
El-Din was born in Daliyat al-Karmel during the Mandate era. He headed the section for demobilised soldiers from 1961 and 1964, and became director of the Yad LeBanim memorial project for killed Druze, Bedouin and Circassian IDF soldiers in 1969. From 1964 until 1971 he served as secretary of the Daliyat al-Karmel and Isfiya Workers Council.

In 1969 his son Lutfi was killed on his last day of his national service. In 2008 his grandson, also named Lutfi, was killed during Operation Cast Lead.

Originally a member of Mapai, he joined Herut in 1971. He was on the Likud list (an alliance of Herut and other right-wing parties) for the 1973 Knesset elections, but failed to win a seat. However, he entered the Knesset on 21 January 1977 as a replacement for Akiva Nof, who had resigned after leaving Likud. el-Din was re-elected in the May 1977 elections, and again in 1981 and 1984, before losing his seat in the 1988 elections.

In 1973, Amel Nasser A-Din founded the Zionist Druze Circle, a group whose aim was to encourage the Druze to support the state of Israel fully and unreservedly. Regarding Druze belief and Jewish-Druze relations, he has stated: "We believe in the same Bible as the Jews. We believe that Isaac, not Ishmael was brought for sacrifice. Mohammad is not our prophet. We are the descendants of Jethro, Moses' father-in-law."

References

External links

1928 births
Living people
Arab supporters of Israel
Druze members of the Knesset
Israeli Druze
Likud politicians
Members of the 8th Knesset (1974–1977)
Members of the 9th Knesset (1977–1981)
Members of the 10th Knesset (1981–1984)
Members of the 11th Knesset (1984–1988)
People from Daliyat al-Karmel